The following events related to sociology occurred in the 1860s.

1860

Births

July 3: Charlotte Perkins Gilman

1861

Events
Sir Henry James Sumner Maine's Ancient Law is published

1862

Events
Lewis Morgan's The Indian Journals is published.
Herbert Spencer's First Principles is published.

1864

Events
Lewis Morgan's Ancient Society is published.
Herbert Spencer's Laws In General is published.

Births
February 14: Robert E. Park
March 30: Franz Oppenheimer
April 21: Max Weber
August 17: Charles Cooley

1867

Events
The First Volume of Karl Marx's Capital is published.
The foundation of the London Positivist Society by Richard Congreve.

1869

Events
Francis Galton's Hereditary Genius is published.
John Stuart Mill's The Subjection of Women is published.

Sociology
Sociology timelines